The Capitol Theatre is a historic theatre in Windsor, Ontario, Canada. Designed by Toronto architect Thomas White Lamb, it was the largest single floor theatre in Canada at the time, with 1,995 seats. 

The theatre was one of 16 Canadian theatres Lamb designed, including Toronto's Pantages (now the Ed Mirvish Theatre), the Elgin and Winter Garden Theatres, and the Ottawa Capitol.

The building was purchased in 1922 by Simon Mertsky and two other partners and it assumed its current name, as the Capitol Theatre. Famous Players (now Cineplex Inc.) purchased the building in 1929.

In 1975, the theatre was divided into three spaces available to rent: The main "Pentastar" theatre with 620 audience seats, the Daniel Patrick Kelly theatre with seating for 200 guests, and the Joy Family theatre for meetings and receptions.

The building closed in 1989 bringing the threat of demolition. In 1995 a group of community leaders and volunteers secured funding from the provincial and federal government to restore and renovate the interior of the building. The volunteer board declared bankruptcy in 2007.

The City purchased the building in 2008 and turned it over to the Windsor Symphony Orchestra to manage and use as their main venue. The Windsor International Film Festival also uses the theatre.

In the heart of Downtown Windsor, the Capitol Theatre currently offers the unique convenience of a three-in-one venue, joined together by a classic lobby and bar area. It is both intimate and spacious; accessible and grand.

Today, the building is owned by the City of Windsor, managed by its anchor tenant, the Windsor Symphony Orchestra, and available to local artists and community groups as a multi-purpose venue for dance, literature, music, drama, film, and more. Generations of families have happy memories of the Capitol, and new ones are being made.

Gallery

References

Buildings and structures in Windsor, Ontario
Theatres in Ontario
Theatres completed in 1920
Loew's Theatres buildings and structures
Movie palaces
Thomas W. Lamb buildings
1920 establishments in Ontario